The Tower Museum is a museum on local history in Derry, Northern Ireland.

The museum is located in Union Hall Place, within a historic tower just inside the city walls, near the Guildhall. The museum has two permanent exhibits; The Story of Derry which presents the history of Derry from its prehistoric origins to the present, and An Armada Shipwreck – La Trinidad Valencera which details the local shipwreck from the Spanish Armada. Tower Museum is the home of the Mabel Colhoun collection. The Museum also has temporary exhibits throughout the year.

The top of the museum has an open air viewing facility, which provides panoramic views of the city centre and the River Foyle.

The museum opened in 1992 and has won a number of awards. It covers the political conflict that has affected the history of the city.

See also
 List of museums in Northern Ireland

References

External links
 Tower Museum website

1992 establishments in Northern Ireland
Museums established in 1992
Museums in County Londonderry
Buildings and structures in Derry (city)
Culture in Derry (city)
History of Derry (city)
Tourist attractions in Derry (city)
Local museums in Northern Ireland
City museums in the United Kingdom